In mathematics, a Koszul–Tate resolution or Koszul–Tate complex of the quotient ring R/M is a projective resolution of it as an R-module which also has a structure of a dg-algebra over R, where R is a commutative ring and M ⊂ R is an ideal. The differential of this complex is called the Koszul–Tate derivation or  Koszul–Tate differential.

Construction
First suppose for simplicity that all rings contain the rational numbers Q. Assume we have a graded supercommutative ring X, so that

ab = (−1)deg(a)deg (b)ba,

with a differential d, with

d(ab) = d(a)b + (−1)deg(a)ad(b)),

and x ∈ X is a homogeneous cycle (dx = 0). Then we can form a new ring

Y = X[T]

of polynomials in a variable T, where the differential is extended to T by

dT=x.

(The polynomial ring is understood in the super sense, so if T has odd degree then T2 = 0.) The result of adding the element T is to kill off the element of the homology of X represented by x, and Y is still a supercommutative ring with derivation.

A Koszul–Tate resolution of R/M can be constructed as follows. We start with the commutative ring R (graded so that all elements have degree 0). Then add new variables as above of degree 1 to kill off all elements of the ideal M in the homology. Then keep on adding more and more new variables (possibly an infinite number) to kill off all homology of positive degree. We end up with a supercommutative graded ring with derivation d whose 
homology is just R/M.

If we are not working over a field of characteristic 0, the construction above still works, but it is usually neater to use the following variation of it. Instead of using polynomial rings X[T], one can use a "polynomial ring with divided powers" X〈T〉, which has a basis of elements

T(i) for i ≥ 0,

where
T(i)T(j) = ((i + j)!/i!j!)T(i+j).

Over a field of characteristic 0, 
T(i) is just Ti/i!.

See also
Lie algebra cohomology

References

M. Henneaux and C. Teitelboim, Quantization of Gauge Systems, Princeton University Press, 1992

Homological algebra
Commutative algebra